Children of the River (also known as Annak Ti Karayan) is a 2019 Philippine indie drama film written, produced and directed by Maricel Cariaga. The film stars Noel Comia Jr., Junyka Santarin, Dave Justine Francis and Ricky Oriarte.

It is one of the entries of Cinemalaya 2019, where it was nominated as Best Film.

Cast
 Noel Comia Jr. as Elias
 Junyka Santarin as Pepsy
 Dave Justine Francis as Robin
 Ricky Oriarte as Agol
 Rich Asuncion as Elvy
 Juancho Trivino as Ted
 Jay Manalo as Capt. Eleazar

Reception
The film received mixed reviews. Veteran screenwriter Ricardo Lee praised the film for showcasing the simple life of the children who are unaware of the war surrounding them and its danger and stated that one of director Maricel Cariaga's strengths is the natural charm of the lives of ordinary people. Michael Tan of Fringe Magazine dismissed the film as a propaganda film disguised as a coming-of-age story, citing the anti-LGBT elements and Noel's character given more exposure than the other lead characters.

References

External links

2019 films
2019 drama films
Filipino-language films
Philippine New Wave
GMA Pictures films